The 2007 Auto Club 500 was the second stock car race of the 2007 NASCAR Nextel Cup Series and the 11th iteration of the event. The race was held on Sunday, February 25, 2007, before an audience of 87,000 in Fontana, California, at California Speedway, a two-mile (3.2 km) moderate-banked D-shaped speedway. The race took the scheduled 200 laps to complete. At race's end, Roush Fenway Racing driver Matt Kenseth would manage to dominate a majority of the race to take his 15th career NASCAR Winston Cup Series victory and his first victory of the season. To fill out the top three, Jeff Gordon and Jimmie Johnson, both drivers for Hendrick Motorsports, would finish second and third, respectively.

Background 

Auto Club Speedway (formerly California Speedway) is a 2 miles (3.2 km), low-banked, D-shaped oval superspeedway in Fontana, California which has hosted NASCAR racing annually since 1997. It is also used for open wheel racing events. The racetrack is located near the former locations of Ontario Motor Speedway and Riverside International Raceway. The track is owned and operated by International Speedway Corporation and is the only track owned by ISC to have naming rights sold. The speedway is served by the nearby Interstate 10 and Interstate 15 freeways as well as a Metrolink station located behind the backstretch.

Entry list 
 (R) denotes rookie driver.

Practice

First practice 
The first practice session was held on Friday, February 23, at 2:30 PM EST. The session would last for one hour and 30 minutes.

Second practice 
The second practice session was held on Saturday, February 24, at 2:00 PM EST. The session would last for 50 minutes.

Final practice 
The final practice session, sometimes referred to as Happy Hour, was held on Saturday, February 24, at 5:20 PM EST. The session would last for 50 minutes.

Qualifying 
Qualifying was held on Friday, February 23, at 1:30 PM EST. Each driver would have two laps to set a fastest time; the fastest of the two would count as their official qualifying lap. While positions 1-42 would be determined by qualifying speed, the top 35 teams in owner's points would be assured that they would earn a spot in the field if they had managed to make an effort to qualify. The remaining seven positions from positions 36-42 would be assigned to those drivers with the fastest qualifying speeds whose car owners are not among the top 35. The final starting position, position 43, can be utilized by a car owner whose driver is a current or past NASCAR Nextel Cup champion who participated as a driver during the current of previous season and was entered in the event for that owner in that car prior to the entry deadline. In the case that iff there was more than one series champion vying for the position, it would be given to the most recent series champion. If the final provisional starting position is not filled by a current or past series champion, it will be assigned to the next eligible car owner according to qualifying results.

Eight drivers would fail to qualify.

Full qualifying results

Race results

Standings after the race 

Drivers' Championship standings

Note: Only the first 12 positions are included for the driver standings.

References 

Auto Club 500
Auto Club 500
NASCAR races at Auto Club Speedway
February 2007 sports events in the United States